Morwennius is a monotypic moth genus in the family Sphingidae described by Alan Charles Cassidy, Michael G. Allen and Tony W. Harman in 2002. Its only species, Morwennius decoratus, the ornamented hawkmoth, was described by Frederic Moore in 1872.

Distribution 
It is known from Nepal, Sikkim and Assam in north-eastern India, Yunnan in south-western China, northern Thailand, Laos, Peninsular Malaysia and Sumatra in Indonesia

Description 
The wingspan is about 72 mm.

References

Smerinthini
Monotypic moth genera
Moths described in 1872
Taxa named by Frederic Moore